This list of tallest buildings in Johor Bahru involves skyscrapers within the city of Johor Bahru in the Johor Bahru District of Johor, Malaysia. This is synonymous with Flagship A of Iskandar Malaysia, which comprises Johor Bahru City Centre and the waterfront city of Danga Bay.



Overview
Johor Bahru is the capital of the state of Johor, Malaysia. The city is situated along the Straits of Johor at the southern end of Peninsular Malaysia. It has a population of 497,097, while its metropolitan area, with a population of 1,638,219, is the third largest in the country.

In recent years, many high-rise developments have sprung up all across Johor Bahru, due in part to the influx of foreign investors. As of 2021, it is estimated that there are over 572 completed high-rises and skyscrapers in the city. According to Council on Tall Buildings and Urban Habitat, Johor Bahru is the second tallest city in the nation, as well as the 63rd tallest city in the world by number of 150m+ completed buildings.

Currently, the tallest skyscraper in this waterfront city is The Astaka Tower A, built in 2018. It stands at 278.8 meters tall (height to architectural top), which also makes it the current tallest residential building in Southeast Asia. It is worth noting that Tower B of the same condominium complex is the second tallest building in Johor Bahru.

List of tallest buildings
This lists ranks skyscrapers in Johor Bahru that stand at least 140 m (459 ft) tall, based on standard height measurement. This includes spires and architectural details but does not include antenna masts. 
This list includes buildings that are completed.

Buildings planned or under construction
This is a list of buildings over 100m that have been planned or are currently under construction within Johor Bahru.

Gallery

See also
List of tallest buildings in the world
List of tallest buildings in Malaysia
List of tallest buildings in Kuala Lumpur
List of tallest buildings in George Town
List of tallest buildings in Kota Kinabalu

References

Emporis.com, general database of skyscrapers
Emporis.com, general database of skyscrapers

Johor Bahru
Johor Bahru